The Bell Hop is a 1921 American silent comedy film  directed by Larry Semon and Norman Taurog and featuring Oliver Hardy.

Cast
 Larry Semon as The bellhop
 Oliver Hardy as Hotel manager (as Babe Hardy)
 Frank Alexander as A government official
 Al Thompson
 Pete Gordon
 Norma Nichols as A maid
 William Hauber as Hotel detective
 Walter Wilkinson as Little boy

See also
 List of American films of 1921

References

External links

1921 films
1921 short films
American silent short films
American black-and-white films
Films directed by Larry Semon
Films directed by Norman Taurog
1921 comedy films
Silent American comedy films
American comedy short films
1920s American films